Young Giant is the debut full-length album from Queens Club.  It was released on March 23, 2010.  This album contained an equal amount of pre-released material and new unreleased recordings.

Track listing
"Are We? Will We?" - 3:22	
"Issinair" - 3:07		
"Cutt Me Off" - 2:36		
"An Apparition" - 3:06	
"Dust" - 3:34	
"Less Talk" - 4:05		
"Lydia" - 2:49	
"Upstart" - 3:35	
"Family Ties" - 3:26
"Nightmarer" - 2:45
"I'm American" - 2:10
"Danger Kids" - 4:07

Credits
Queens Club consists of:
Dan Eaton - singer/ guitarist
Andy Nichols - guitarist
Tyler Bottles - bassist
Jake Ryan - drummer

Other Info
The song "Danger Kids" was used as the theme song for the 2011 racing game TrackMania 2: Canyon.

References

2010 debut albums
Queens Club (band) albums